AES50 is an Audio over Ethernet protocol for multichannel digital audio. It is defined by the AES50-2011 standard for High-resolution multi-channel audio interconnection (HRMAI).

Origins
AES50 is based on the SuperMAC protocol created by Sony Pro Audio Lab (now Oxford Digital). The preliminary standard was assigned the AES-X140 project designation in 2003, and was finally approved in 2005 as a royalty-free open standard.

HyperMAC is an improved protocol based on Gigabit Ethernet physical layer, allowing more channels and lower audio latency. It was considered for an alternate physical layer in a future revision of AES50, but standardisation did not move forward.

Sony licensed its proprietary software implementations of SuperMAC and HyperMAC to Midas Consoles for their Midas XL8 digital mixer. Midas parent Klark Teknik took over the SuperMAC and HyperMAC patents in 2007, then in 2009 Midas and Klark Teknik were acquired by Uli Behringer's Music Group.

The AES50 protocol is implemented in digital mixing consoles by Midas and Behringer to transfer digital audio between the remote stage boxes.

Specifications 
AES50 is a point-to-point interconnect which carries multiple channels of AES3, PCM or DSD bitstream formats, along with system clock and synchronisation signals, over Cat 5 cable using 100 Mbit/s Fast Ethernet physical layer. 

AES50 uses the four pairs of the Cat 5 cable in the 8P8C connector:

 Audio data transmit +
 Audio data transmit –
 Audio data receive +
 Sync signal transmit +
 Sync signal transmit –
 Audio data receive –
 Sync signal receive +
 Sync signal receive –

Audio data is transmitted in bidirectional full-duplex mode over two differential pairs used by the 100BASE-TX standard, and word clock sync signal is transmitted over the remaining differential pairs not used by the Fast Ethernet layer. Using separate copper pairs for clock signal simplifies connection setup and allows phase-accurate low-jitter clock sync. 

AES50 only employs the Ethernet protocol's physical layer (layer 1), relying on Ethernet frames to continuously stream audio data. A proprietary link layer (layer 2) implements a point-to-point audio transmission protocol. It uses a cyclic redundancy check (CRC) for each Ethernet frame and a Hamming code scheme can recover from individual bit errors. The audio data is interleaved so that neighbouring bits belong to different samples, allowing the receiving end to correct burst errors. Specialised cross-point routers can converrt multiple point-to-point AES50 links to a centralised star topology.

The AES50 protocol supports 24-bit PCM audio and delta-sigma bistream formats (Direct Stream Digital), with sample rates that are a multiple of 44.1 or 48 kHz. The bandwidth of 100 Mbit/s allows 48 channels at 48 kHz sample rate, or 24 channels at 96 kHz sample rate. The latency is 6 samples at 96 kHz and 3 samples at 48 kHz, or 62.50 μs. In practical implementations of the SuperMAC and HyperMAC protocols, only 96 kHz PCM formats are supported.

AES50 also supports packet-based auxiliary channel for control data over the same data link. The control channel is allocated a fixed bandwidth of 5 Mbit/s; control data are embedded in the same Ethernet frame as the audio data.

HyperMAC

The HyperMAC protocol is based on the Gigabit Ethernet physical layer for Cat 5e cable (up to 100 m) or OM2 multi-mode fibre (up to 500 m) with embedded clocking. It allows up to 192 bidirectional channels at 96 kHz and 384 channels at 48 kHz;  the latency is 4 samples at 96 kHz or 2 samples at 48 kHz, or 41.66 μs. The bandwidth of the auxilliary data link is increased to 200 Mbit/s and control data is transmitted with separate control frames.

Implementations
 Midas XL8 digital mixer
 Midas PRO6 digital mixer
 Behringer X32 digital mixer
 Midas M32 digital mixer
 Behringer S32/S16/S8 digital stage boxes
 Behringer SD8/SD16 digital stage boxes
 Midas DL461 Audio System Signal Router
 Klark Teknik DN9650 network bridge
 Behringer WING digital mixer

References

External links
 

Audio network protocols
Networking standards
Audio engineering
Audio Engineering Society standards